Bernard Pratte (December 17, 1803August 10, 1886) was the eighth mayor of St. Louis, Missouri, serving between 1844 and 1846.

References

External links 
 Bernard Pratte at the St. Louis Public Library: St. Louis Mayors website.

1803 births
1886 deaths
Mayors of St. Louis
19th-century American politicians